Krasnodar, formerly Yekaterinodar (until 1920), is the largest city and the administrative centre of Krasnodar Krai, Russia. The city stands on the Kuban River in southern Russia, with a population of 1,099,344 residents, and up to 1.2 million residents in the Urban Okrug. In the past decade Krasnodar has experienced rapid population growth, rising to become the thirteenth-largest city in Russia, and the second-largest city in southern Russia, as well as the Southern Federal District. 

The city originated in 1793 as a fortress built by the Cossacks, and became a trading center for southern Russia. The city sustained heavy damage in World War II but was rebuilt and renovated after the war. Krasnodar is a major economic hub in southern Russia; In 2012, Forbes named Krasnodar the best city for business in Russia. Krasnodar is home to numerous sights, including the Krasnodar Stadium. Its main airport is Krasnodar International Airport.

Name
Krasnodar was founded on January 12, 1794 (Gregorian calendar) as Yekaterinodar. The original name meant "Catherine's Gift", recognizing both Catherine the Great's grant of land in the Kuban region to the Black Sea Cossacks (created from former Zaporozhian Cossacks) and Saint Catherine of Alexandria, who is considered to be the patron of the city. City status was granted in 1867.

On December 7, 1920, as a result of the October Revolution, Yekaterinodar was renamed Krasnodar (Gift of the Reds). The new name consists of Krasno- (Красно- – 'red', i.e. Communist, but also archaic/poetic form of 'beautiful'); and dar (дар – 'gift').

History

The city originated in 1793 as a military camp, then as a fortress built by the Cossacks to defend imperial borders and to assert Russian dominion over Circassia, a claim which Ottoman Turkey contested. In the first half of the 19th century, Yekaterinodar grew into a busy center of the Kuban Cossacks, gaining official town status in 1867. By 1888 about 45,000 people lived in the city, which had become a vital trade center for southern Russia. In 1897 an obelisk commemorating the two-hundred-year history of the Kuban Cossacks (seen as founded in 1696) was erected in Yekaterinodar. The city was the administrative center of the Yekaterinodarsky Otdel of the Kuban Oblast.

During the Russian Civil War (1917-1922) the city changed hands several times, coming successively under the control of the Red Army and of the Volunteer Army. Many Kuban Cossacks, as committed anti-Bolsheviks, supported the White Movement. Lavr Kornilov, a White general, captured the city on April 10, 1918, only to be killed a week later when a Bolshevik artillery shell blew up the farmhouse where he had set up his headquarters. During the Soviet famine of 1932–1933 Krasnodar lost over 14% of its population.

During World War II units of the German Army occupied Krasnodar between August 9, 1942, and February 12, 1943. The city sustained heavy damage in the fighting but was rebuilt and renovated after the war. German forces, including Gestapo and "mobile SS execution squads", killed thousands of Jews, Communists, and "supposed Communist 'partisans.'" Shooting, hanging, burning, and even gas vans were used.

In the summer of 1943, the Soviets began trials, including of their own citizens, for collusion with the Nazis and for participation in war crimes. The first such trial took place at Krasnodar from July 14 to 17, 1943. The Krasnodar tribunal pronounced eight death sentences, which were summarily carried out in the city square in front of a crowd of about thirty thousand people.

On June 14, 1971, a bombing occurred on a bus in the city, when a homemade suitcase bomb placed near the gas tank by a mentally ill Peter Volynsky exploded. The bomb killed 10 persons and wounded 20–90 others.

Geography 
Krasnodar is the largest city and capital of Krasnodar Krai by population and the second-largest by area. It is the 17th-largest city in Russia  It is located on the right bank of the Kuban River. It is 1300 km south of the Russian capital, Moscow. The Black Sea lies 120 km to the west.

Climate
Under the Köppen climate classification, Krasnodar has a humid subtropical climate (Cfa).

Winters are cold and damp, with unstable snow cover. Weather conditions in winter vary greatly in the city; temperatures can exceed  for a few days, but temperatures below  are not uncommon for Krasnodar as the city is not protected by mountains from cold waves.

The city receives  of precipitation annually, fairly spread throughout the year. Extreme storms are rare in the Krasnodar area.

Demographics 

In 1916, Krasnodar—then known as Yekaterinodar—had a population of 103,624, composed of 88,508 Russians (85.4%), 5,963 Europeans (5.8%), 5,900 Armenians (5.7%), and other nationalities.

 census, the population of Krasnodar is 1,099,344 people, up from 744,995 in the 2010 census.

Economy

Krasnodar is the economic center of southern Russia. For several years, Forbes magazine named Krasnodar the best city for business in Russia. The industrial sector of the city has more than 130 large and medium-sized enterprises.

The main industries of Krasnodar:
Agriculture and food industry: 42.8%
Energy sector: 13.4%
Fuel industry: 10.5%
Machine construction: 9.4%
Forestry and chemical industries: about 4%

Krasnodar is a highly developed commercial area, and has the largest annual turnover in the Southern Federal District of Russia. Retail trade turnover in 2010 reached 290 billion rubles. Per capita, Krasnodar has the highest number of malls in Russia. Note that in the crisis year 2009 turnover of Krasnodar continued to grow, while most of the cities showed a negative trend in the sale of goods.

Krasnodar has the lowest unemployment rate among the cities of the Southern Federal District at 0.3% of the total working-age population. In addition, Krasnodar holds the first place in terms of highest average salary – 21,742 rubles per capita.

Tourism comprises a large part of Krasnodar's economy. There are more than 80 hotels in Krasnodar. The Hilton Garden Inn, opened in 2013, is the first world-class hotel in the city.

Administrative and municipal status
Krasnodar is the administrative center of the krai. Within the framework of administrative divisions, it is, together with twenty-nine rural localities, incorporated as the City of Krasnodar—an administrative unit with the status equal to that of the districts. As a municipal division, the City of Krasnodar is incorporated as Krasnodar Urban Okrug.

Culture

The oldest part of the city is Krasnodar Historic Center, which consists of many historic buildings, several from the 19th century. Buildings have been preserved, restored or reconstructed, and the district is now a substantial tourist attraction.

There are several major theater venues in Krasnodar:
The Gorky Krasnodar State Academic Drama Theater
The Krasnodar Ballet Theater
The Krasnodar State Academic Drama Theater
The Krasnodar Regional Puppet Theater
The Krasnodar Musical Theater
The Children's Ballet Theater "Fugitives"
The Krasnodar State Circus
The Krasnodar Youth Theater
The Ponomarenko Krasnodar Philharmonic
The Kuban Cossack Choir
The Creative Association "Premiere"
The New Puppet Theater

Krasnodar has several major museums. The Kovalenko Krasnodar Regional Art Museum, the oldest public art museum in the North Caucasus, is one of the finest.

The largest public library of the city is the Pushkin Krasnodar Regional Universal Scientific Library, founded in 1900.

Main sights

Krasnodar is home to the steel lattice hyperboloid tower built by the Russian engineer and scientist Vladimir Grigorievich Shukhov in 1928; it is located near Krasnodar Circus.

Other attractions include St. Catherine's Cathedral, the State Arts Museum, a park and theater named after Maxim Gorky, the beautiful concert hall of the Krasnodar Philharmonic Society, which is considered to have some of the best acoustics in southern Russia, State Cossack Choir and the Krasnodar circus

The most interesting place in Krasnodar is Krasnaya Street (which translates as "Red, Beautiful Street"). There are situated many sights of Krasnodar. At the beginning of the street, one can see the Central Concert Hall; at the other end, one can see the Avrora cinema center. A "Triumphal Arch" is situated in the middle of Krasnaya Street.

Theater Square is home to the largest splash fountain in Europe. This fountain was officially inaugurated on September 25, 2011 along with an official ceremony to celebrate the City Day in Krasnodar.

Also in the city is the famous Krasnodar Park (also called Galitsky Park) — a city park located in the northeast of the center of Krasnodar in the Shkolny microdistrict, between Vostochno-Kruglikovskaya and Hero Vladislav Posadsky streets, next to the FC Krasnodar stadium. The park was built at the expense of entrepreneur Sergey Galitsky and opened on September 28, 2017. The area is 22.7 hectares. This is twice as much as the Novorossiysk forest! More than 2.5 thousand trees are planted in the park: oak, hornbeam, alder, bonsai, poplar, pine, tulip tree, maple, thuja, decorative plum.

Sports
In amateur sport shinty in Russia has its centre in Krasnodar.
Several professional sports clubs are active in the city:

Transportation
As in many other major cities in Russia, the primary mode of local transportation in Krasnodar is the automobile, though efforts have been made to increase the availability of alternative modes of transportation, including the construction of light railways (projected), biking paths, and wide sidewalks. Public transportation within Krasnodar consists of city buses, trolleybuses, trams, and marshrutkas (routed taxis). Trolleybuses and trams, both powered by overhead electric wires, are the main form of public transportation in Krasnodar, which does not have a metro system.

The main airline was Kuban Airlines (at Krasnodar International Airport), but it closed down in 2012 and now the main ones are Aeroflot and Rossiya Airlines. The largest hotels in the city include the Intourist, Hotel Moskva, and Hotel Platan. Krasnodar uses a 220 V/50 Hz power supply with two round-pin outlets, like most European countries.

There are also two railway stations in Krasnodar: Krasnodar-1 and Krasnodar-2.

Education
In Krasnodar there are 15 gymnasiums (academic secondary schools) 5 lyceums (colleges of higher education), 110 schools of general education and 20 specialized schools, as well as 7 non-state lyceums and schools.

The city has numerous institutions of higher education, including some state universities (Kuban State University, Kuban State Technological University, Kuban State Agrarian University, Kuban State Medical University, etc.). Other universities include: Marketing and Social Technology University of Krasnodar.

Coat of arms
The coat of arms of Yekaterinodar was introduced in 1841 by the Cossack yesaul Ivan Chernik. The royal letter "E" in the middle is for Ekaterina II (Russian for Catherine II). It also depicts the date the city was founded, the Imperial double headed eagle (symbolizing Tsar's patronage of the Black Sea Cossacks), a bulawa of a Cossack ataman, Yekaterinodar fortress, and flags with letters "E", "P", "A", and "N" standing for Catherine II, Paul I, Alexander I and Nicholas I. Yellow stars around the shield symbolized 59 Black Sea stanitsas around the city.

Notable people

Nina Agadzhanova (1889–1974), film writer and director,
Alexandre Bondar (born 1972), writer and novelist
Natalia Chernova (born 1976), gymnast
Tatyana Chernova (born 1988), heptathlon athlete
Violetta Egorova (born 1969), concert pianist
Ilya Ezhov (born 1987), ice hockey goaltender, Gagarin Cup champion
Pyotr Gavrilov (1900–1979), Soviet war hero, last defender of the Brest Fortress
Alexander Karasyov (born 1971), writer
Irina Karavayeva (born 1975), trampoline gymnast
Eduard Koksharov (born 1975), handball player
Viktor Likhonosov (1936–2021), writer
Boris Loza (born 1960), information systems security professional
Anna Netrebko (born 1971), opera singer
Gennady Padalka (born 1958), cosmonaut
Lazaros Papadopoulos, (born 1980), Greek basketball player
Viktor Popkov (1946–2001), Old Believer & Humanitarian
Andrei Shkuro (1887–1947), counter revolutionary
Alexander Tamanian (1878–1936), neoclassical architect
Sergei Tiviakov (born 1973), chess Grandmaster
Sergei Vorzhev (born 1950), artist
Inna Zhukova (born 1986), rhythmic gymnast
Yevgeniya Zhigulenko (1920-1994) navigator 46th Taman Guards Night Bomber Aviation Regiment, film-maker

International relations

Twin towns – sister cities

Krasnodar is twinned with:

 Burgas, Bulgaria
 Ferrara, Italy
 Harbin, China
 Karlsruhe, Germany
 Nancy, France
 Sukhumi, Georgia
 Tallahassee, United States
 Wels, Austria

Partner cities
Krasnodar cooperates with:
 Larnaca, Cyprus
 Nottingham, United Kingdom
 Yerevan, Armenia

See also 

 Geography of Krasnodar
List of mayors of Krasnodar

References

Notes

Sources

Lichtblau, Eric. "The Nazis Next Door: How America Became A Safe Haven For Hitler's Men" (2014) pp: 47–48.

Bibliography

External links

Official website of Krasnodar City Administration and City Duma
Krasnodar news
News and events in Krasnodar
Old pictures of Yekaterinodar

 
Cities and towns in Krasnodar Krai
Kuban Oblast
1794 establishments in the Russian Empire
Populated places established in 1793
Holocaust locations in Russia